Lizard King Records was a London-based independent record label founded in 2002 by Martin Heath and Dominic Hardisty.

History
The label signed US rock band The Killers in July 2003. According to Heath in an interview with HitQuarters, "Everyone in America had turned them down. They had been out for a year looking for a deal but nobody was interested." The label then released the band's first single, "Mr. Brightside", on a limited press of 500 within the UK and then on a mass scale worldwide in 2004 and 2005. They also released second singles and a debut album before they were then signed by Island Records.

Around 2005/06 Heath and Hardisty decided to go their separate ways and Hardisty formed a new label Marrakesh Records.

Lizard King's distribution goes through ADA in America and Pinnacle in the UK.

Artists

ME (band)
Clear Static
Drive-by Argument
Santigold (previously known as Santogold)
The Pierces
The Go
The Killers
 Greater Good
Oxzana
Valentina Fel
Erasmo de la Parra

References

British independent record labels